Schwarzkopf is a mountain of Bavaria, Germany.

References

 

Mountains of Bavaria
Bohemian Forest
Mountains of the Bavarian Forest